Dairyland, California may refer to:
 Dairyland, Madera County, California
 Dairyland, Orange County, California, renamed La Palma in 1965